Triteleia laxa (previously Brodiaea laxa) is a triplet lily known by several common names, including Ithuriel's spear, common triteleia and grassnut. It is native to California where it is a common wildflower, and it is occasionally found in southwestern Oregon. It bears a tall, naked stem topped with a spray of smaller stalks, each ending in a purple or blue flower. The flower is tubular, opening into a sharply six-pointed star. The plant grows from a corm which is edible and similar in taste and use as the potato. The most used common name for the species, Ithuriel's spear, is a reference to the angel Ithuriel from Milton's Paradise Lost.

Cultivation 
Hardiness: USDA 6-10

Etymology
The genus name Triteleia is derived from Greek and means 'triplicate', a reference to its flower parts, which are in multiples of three. The epithet laxa means 'open', 'uncrowded', 'distant', 'spreading', or 'lax'. It is derived from the Latin adjective , meaning 'flaccid, loose'.

References

External links

Jepson Manual Treatment
Species account
Photo gallery
Ethnobotany

laxa
Flora of California
Flora of Oregon
Flora of the Sierra Nevada (United States)
Natural history of the California chaparral and woodlands
Natural history of the California Coast Ranges
Natural history of the Central Valley (California)
Natural history of the San Francisco Bay Area
Plants described in 1835
Flora without expected TNC conservation status